Mirianée Zaragoza Hernández (born 15 July 1998) is a Puerto Rican footballer who plays as a defender for Portuguese Liga BPI club CS Marítimo and the Puerto Rico women's national team.

References

1998 births
Living people
Women's association football defenders
People from Hatillo, Puerto Rico
Puerto Rican women's footballers
Puerto Rico women's international footballers